"Yi script" is an umbrella term for two scripts used to write the Yi languages; Classical Yi (an ideogram script), and the later Yi syllabary. The script is historically known in Chinese as Cuan Wen or Wei Shu and various other names, among them "tadpole writing".

This is to be distinguished from romanized Yi (彝文羅馬拼音 Yíwén Luómǎ pīnyīn) which was a system (or systems) invented by missionaries and intermittently used afterwards by some government institutions. There was also a Yi abugida or alphasyllabary devised by Sam Pollard, the Pollard script for the Miao language, which he adapted into "Nasu" as well. Present day traditional Yi writing can be sub-divided into five main varieties (Huáng Jiànmíng 1993); Nuosu (the prestige form of the Yi language centred on the Liangshan area), Nasu (including the Wusa), Nisu (Southern Yi), Sani (撒尼) and Azhe (阿哲).

Classical Yi

Classical Yi is a syllabic logographic system that was reputedly devised, according to Nuosu mythology, during the Tang dynasty (618–907) by a Nuosu hero called Aki. However, the earliest surviving examples of the Yi script date back to only the late 15th century and early 16th century, the earliest dated example being an inscription on a bronze bell dated to 1485. There are tens of thousands of manuscripts in the Yi script, dating back several centuries, although most are undated. In recent years a number of Yi manuscript texts written in traditional Yi script have been published.

The original script is said to have comprised 1,840 characters, but over the centuries widely divergent glyph forms have developed in different Yi-speaking areas, an extreme example being the character for "stomach" which exists in some forty glyph variants. Due to this regional variation as many as 90,000 different Yi glyphs are known from manuscripts and inscriptions. Although similar to Chinese in function, the glyphs are independent in form, with little to suggest that they are directly related. However, there are some borrowings from Chinese, such as the characters for numbers used in some Yi script traditions.

Languages written with the classical script included Nuosu, Nisu, Wusa Nasu, and Mantsi.

Modern Yi
The Modern Yi script (   [nɔ̄sβ̩ bβ̠̩mā]  'Nuosu script') is a standardized syllabary derived from the classic script in 1974 by the local Chinese government.

In 1980 it was made the official script of the Liangshan dialect of the Nuosu Yi language of Liangshan Yi Autonomous Prefecture, and consequently is known as Liangshan Standard Yi Script (涼山規範彝文 Liángshān guīfàn Yíwén). Other dialects of Yi do not yet have a standardized script. There are 756 basic glyphs based on the Liangshan dialect, plus 63 for syllables used only for words borrowed from Chinese.

The native syllabary represents vowel and consonant-vowel syllables, formed of 43 consonants and 8 vowels that can occur with any of three tones, plus two "buzzing" vowels that can only occur as mid tone. Not all combinations are possible.

Although the Liangshan dialect has four tones (and others have more), only three tones (high, mid, low) have separate glyphs. The fourth tone (rising) may sometimes occur as a grammatical inflection of the mid tone, so it is written with the mid-tone glyph plus a diacritic mark (a superscript arc). Counting syllables with this diacritic, the script represents 1,164 syllables. In addition there is a syllable iteration mark, ꀕ (represented as w in Yi pinyin), that is used to reduplicate a preceding syllable.

Syllabary
The syllabary of standard modern Yi is illustrated in the table below. The sound represented by the column comes first. (view table as an image):

The symbols , are unique. As the root syllable (i.e. hno) for their characters does not have a form in the normal mid tone, they use the -p tone character with an -x tone diacritic.

Yi in pinyin

The expanded pinyin letters used to write Yi are:

Consonants
The consonant series are tenuis stop, aspirate, voiced, prenasalized, voiceless nasal, voiced nasal, voiceless fricative, voiced fricative, respectively. With stops and affricates (as well as s), voicing is shown by doubling the letter.

Plosive series
Labial: b , p , bb , nb , hm , m , f , v 
Alveolar: d , t , dd , nd , hn , n , hl , l 
Velar: g , k , gg , mg , hx , ng , h , w

Affricate series
Alveolar: z , c , zz , nz , s , ss 
Retroflex: zh , ch , rr , nr , sh , r 
Palatal: j , q , jj , nj , ny , x , y

Vowels

Tones

An unmarked syllable has mid level tone (33), i.e.  (or alternatively ). Other tones are shown by a final letter:
t : high level tone (55), i.e.  (or alternatively )
x : high rising tone (34), i.e.  (or alternatively )
p : low falling tone (21), i.e.  (or alternatively )

Unicode 

The Unicode block for Modern Yi is Yi syllables (U+A000 to U+A48C), and comprises 1,164 syllables (syllables with a diacritic mark are encoded separately, and are not decomposable into syllable plus combining diacritical mark) and one syllable iteration mark (U+A015, incorrectly named YI SYLLABLE WU). In addition, a set of 55 radicals for use in dictionary classification are encoded at U+A490 to U+A4C6 (Yi Radicals). Yi syllables and Yi radicals were added as new blocks to Unicode Standard with version 3.0.

Classical Yi - which is an ideographic script like the Chinese characters - has not yet been encoded in Unicode, but a proposal to encode 88,613 Classical Yi characters was made in 2007.

See also 
 Chinese family of scripts
 Nisoish languages

Further reading 
Miyake, Marc. 2011. Yi romanization. (Parts 1-5, 6.)

References

External links 
 Dr Halina Wasilewska -- The Yi writing system and its position among the scripts of East Asia
  Dr Kazue Iwasa -- Geolinguistical approach to the analysis of Yi characters and current findings
 "Introduction to encode Yi Ideographs in UCS"
 Yi script and language at Omniglot
 Pronunciation of Yi Consonant and Vowel
 Yi People.com Official Yi language version of the People's Daily website

Syllabary writing systems